Phosphorus virescens is a species of beetle in the family Cerambycidae. It was described by Olivier in 1795, originally under the genus Cerambix. It has a wide distribution throughout Africa.

Varietas
 Phosphorus virescens var. congolanus Lesne, 1914
 Phosphorus virescens var. angolator (Olivier, 1795)
 Phosphorus virescens var. bibudiensis Hintz, 1919
 Phosphorus virescens var. gabonator Thomson, 1865
 Phosphorus virescens var. albidipennis Breuning, 1942
 Phosphorus virescens var. nimbata Lesne, 1914
 Phosphorus virescens var. jansoni Chevrolat, 1861
 Phosphorus virescens var. lambda Lesne, 1914
 Phosphorus virescens var. grisescens Breuning, 1934

References

Tragocephalini
Beetles described in 1795